Hopea canarensis is a species of plant in the family Dipterocarpaceae. It is endemic to Karnataka in India.

References

canarensis
Flora of Karnataka
Data deficient plants
Taxonomy articles created by Polbot